Harbans Mukhia (born 1939) is an Indian historian whose principal area of study is medieval India.

Biography 

He received his Bachelors in Arts (BA) in history in 1958 from Kirori Mal College, Delhi University and then earned his doctorate from Department of History, Delhi University in 1969. Mukhia worked at Jawaharlal Nehru University (JNU), New Delhi as Professor of Medieval History at the Centre for Historical Studies. He was rector of JNU from 1999 to 2002 and retired in February 2004..

Honors and awards
 Fellowship of the Indian Institute of Advanced Study, Simla (1971) 
 Homi Bhabha Fellowship (1979–1981) 
 Directeur d’Étude Associé, EHESS, Paris, 1980-2003 (a month every year)1980-2003. 
 UGC National Lecturer (1985–1986)
 UGC National Fellow (1991–1993)
 Visiting Professor, The British Academy, London, February–March, 1993. 
 Senior Visiting Fellow, International Institute for Asian Studies, Leiden (1997)
 Fellow, IDPAD, University of Amsterdam, October 2004.
 National Fellow, Indian Council of Historical Research, 2014-16.

Books
As author
 The Mughals of India (Peoples of Asia) 
 Perspectives on Medieval History 
 Historians and Historiography During the Reign of Akbar 
  Issues in Indian History, Politics and Society 
  Exploring India’s Medieval Centuries: Essays in History, Society, Culture and Technology 

As editor
 Feudalism and Non-European Socieites (Special issue of the Journal of Peasant Studies, 12) T. J. Byres, Harbans Mukhia (Editor) ASIN B0017DM8SQ
 Religion, Religiosity, and Communalism; Praful Bidwai, Harbans Mukhia, and Achin Vanaik Bidwai  ASIN B001NJD892
 French Studies in History: The Inheritance Harbans Mukhia, Maurice Aymard (Editor) 
 The Feudalism Debate  
 French Studies in History: The Departures 
 Understanding India: Indology and Beyond, Harbans Mukhia,  Jaroslav Vacek, Prague, 2012. 
 The History of Technology in India, vol II, Medieval India, New Delhi, 2012.

Festschriften
 Rethinking a Millennium: Essays for Harbans Mukhia: perspectives on Indian history from the 8th to the 18th century (Hardcover); editor Rajat Dutta

References 

1939 births
Fellows of the Royal Historical Society
Historians of South Asia
Indian Marxists
Indian Marxist historians
Living people
Historiography of India
Indian political writers
Delhi University alumni
Academic staff of Jawaharlal Nehru University
Writers from Delhi
20th-century Indian historians
Indian male writers
English-language writers from India